Jacob Steinhardt (1887–1968) was a German-born Israeli painter and woodcut artist.

Biography

Jacob Steinhardt was born in Zerkow, German Empire (now Żerków, Poland). He attended the School of Art in Berlin in 1906, then studied painting with Lovis Corinth and engraving with Hermann Struck in 1907. From 1908 to 1910 he lived in Paris, where he associated with Henri Matisse and Théophile Steinlen, and in 1911 he was in Italy. When World War I broke out, he enlisted in the German Army, and served on the Eastern Front in Poland and Lithuania, and then in Macedonia. After the war, he returned to Berlin, and in 1922 married Minni Gumpert. They immigrated to Palestine in 1933, after he was harassed by the German police, dominated by the Nazis who recently came to power.

Steinhardt died in 1968. He is buried in Nahariya.

Artistic career
Jacob Steinhardt worked mainly in woodcuts depicting biblical and Jewish subjects. He participated in the Berlin Secession and founded the Pathetiker Group. He was a member of the Bezalel school group. In 1934, Steinhardt opened an art school in Jerusalem. In 1948, he became Chairman of the Graphics Department at the Bezalel Academy of Art and Design. He served as director of the school in 1954–1957.

Collections
The Jewish Museum Berlin houses the largest Steinhardt collection in the world, including numerous graphic artworks and unpublished documents donated by Josefa Bar-On Steinhardt, the artist's daughter. The museum owns paintings, several hundred print graphics, and a collection of books illustrated by the artist.
It is also possible to discover some of his work at the Jewish Museum Frankfurt and the at the Jewish Museum of Switzerland in Basel.

References

External links 
 Steinhardt art prints 
 2010 Steinhardt exhibition at the Israel Museum, Jerusalem
 Steinhardt in the online collection of the Jewish Museum Berlin

1887 births
1968 deaths
People from Jarocin County
People from the Province of Posen
Jewish emigrants from Nazi Germany to Mandatory Palestine
Israeli printmakers
Jewish painters
Academic staff of Bezalel Academy of Arts and Design
20th-century Israeli painters
German Jewish military personnel of World War I
20th-century printmakers